"Alma Llanera" ("Soul of the Plains") is a Venezuelan song, a joropo, created by Venezuelan musicians Pedro Elías Gutiérrez (composer) and Rafael Bolívar Coronado (lyricist). It was originally part of a zarzuela whose premiere was on September 19, 1914, at the Teatro Caracas. Alma Llanera has since come to be considered as Venezuela's unofficial second national anthem. Its hundredth anniversary was marked by its being declared Bien de Interés Cultural.

The first part of Alma Llanera is inspired on the waltz Marisela by composer Sebastian Díaz Peña from Venezuela, while the second part of Alma Llanera is inspired on the waltz Mita by the Curaçaon composer Jan Gerard Palm (1831-1906).  The title refers to the Llaneros, the herders of Venezuela  whose culture is part of the country popular imagery. The llanero culture is at the root of the joropo, firstly as a dance and then as a musical genre.

It is a tradition in Venezuela to end any social reunion or party with the intonation of Alma Llanera. The OSV (Venezuela Symphony Orchestra) made an arrangement of this piece of music to commemorate the 75 years of this widely popular song.
Today, Alma Llanera is considered as a Latin America landmark song and has been performed by many famous singers all over the world such as the Spanish tenor, Plácido Domingo.

The original lyrics of the Alma Llanera are as follows:Yo nací en esta ribera
del Arauca vibrador,
soy hermana de la espuma,
de las garzas, de las rosas,
soy hermana de la espuma, 
de las garzas, de las rosas
y del sol, y del sol.

Me arrulló la viva Diana
de la brisa en el palmar,
y por eso tengo el alma
como el alma primorosa,
y por eso tengo el alma
como el alma primorosa
del cristal, del cristal.

Amo, lloro, canto, sueño
con claveles de pasión,
con claveles de pasión.
Amo, lloro, canto, sueño
para ornar las rubias crines
del potro de mi amador.

Yo nací en esta ribera
del Arauca vibrador,
soy hermana de la espuma,
de las garzas, de las rosas
y del sol.

A translation:I was born in this bank
of the vibrating Arauca River,
I am sister of its foam,
of the herons, of the roses,
I am  sister of its foam,
of the herons, of the roses
and the sun, and the sun.

I was lulled by the vivid reveille
of the breeze in the palm grove,
and so I have the soul
like the exquisite soul,
and so I have the soul
like the exquisite soul 
of the crystal, of the crystal.

I love, I weep, I sing, I dream
with carnations of passion,
with carnations of passion.
I love, I weep, I sing, I dream
to adorn the blonde mane
of my lover's colt.

I was born in this bank
of the vibrating Arauca River,
I am  sister of its foam,
of the herons, of the roses
and the sun.

See also
 Orquesta Caraqueña

References

External links 
Listen Alma Llanera
listen to instrumental Alma Llanera
 The Great Soprano and Tenor of China sing  Alma llanera.

Spanish-language songs
Venezuelan songs